
The jian is a double-edged straight sword used during the last 2,500 years in China.
Jian may also refer to:

Weapons
Jian (sword breaker), the Chinese sword breaker/club mace
Chinese arrow

Chinese history and culture
Jian of Qi, the last king of the ancient Chinese state of Qi
Jian (bird), a bird in Chinese mythology
Jian (surname), Mandarin Pinyin of the name 簡/简 
 Jian (unit), a traditional unit of length and area in building large structures

Others
Jian (era), a Japanese era from 1021 through 1024
Jian Ghomeshi (born 1966/1967), Canadian broadcaster 
Jian (1986), a novel by Eric Van Lustbader
Jian, Iran (disambiguation)

See also
 Ji'an (disambiguation)